Kletsky is a rural locality (a khutor) and the administrative center of Kletskoye Rural Settlement, Sredneakhtubinsky District, Volgograd Oblast, Russia. The population was 1,666 as of 2010. There are 35 streets.

Geography 
Kletsky is located on the north bank of the Kletskoye Lake, 28 km southwest of Srednyaya Akhtuba (the district's administrative centre) by road. Pryshchevka is the nearest rural locality.

References 

Rural localities in Sredneakhtubinsky District